"Gone Boy" is the ninth episode of the twenty-ninth season of the American animated television series The Simpsons, and the 627th episode of the series overall. It aired in the United States on Fox on December 10, 2017. The title is a spoof of the novel Gone Girl.

Plot
Sideshow Bob is collecting trash for community service with other men. However, when they finish the work, the Simpson family runs over it with a rental car. After finishing up the rental time and fuel, Homer goes with Bart to play. However, Bart needs to pee and goes in the forest, falling down a manhole. Bart finds himself in a strange bunker, where he finds electronic equipment, which appears to be a military installation. Bart tries to escape, but the ladder gives in. Milhouse finds the entrance, but fails to help him.

The family and the Springfield Police Department as well as Bob and the other detainees start searching the forest for Bart, but Chief Wiggum and his fellow police officers fail as usual. The news states Bart is dead, but Milhouse fails to bring the good news in favor of Lisa's affection and Bob struggles to accept it. When Bart finds a phone in the bunker, he calls Marge to assure her he is alive.

When Milhouse leaves the house after getting more hugs from Lisa, Bob forces him to bring him to Bart with the family right behind. Bob shoves Milhouse down the manhole and then follows him immediately. Homer and Grampa fail to find them once again while Bob ties them up to a Titan II missile and tries to launch them and kill both. He soon has a change of heart and saves them at the advice of the injured prison therapist, as the missile crashes near the other sculptures as three people laugh at the Norad name. Back in prison, Bob begins his prison therapy, vowing to do good when his life sentences are done.

Many years later, Bob has retired to a secluded lighthouse as a mailman delivers his mail.

Reception
Dennis Perkins of The A.V. Club gave this episode a B+, stating, "A coherent narrative throughline—check. Carefully nurtured extended gags—check. Lines that actually made me laugh out loud—a handful of checks. Couple all that with a refreshing lack of atonal jokes that either violate the show’s spirit or pander glibly to pop cultural ephemera, and even a halfway decent repurposed Christmas couch gag, and I found that, by the end of ‘Gone Boy,’ I'd had a uniformly good time watching The Simpsons."

Tony Sokol of Den of Geek gave the episode 3/5 stars, saying, "The premise promised...by the title  of The Simpsons season 29, episode 9, ‘Gone Boy,’ would have made for a far more original offering from the series. The book and film Gone Girl was about a missing wife, who lived such a duplicitous double life, no one wanted to believe the most obvious suspect, her husband, was indeed the killer, had only she died. Bart Simpson lives a duplicitous life and everyone would believe his mortal nemesis would have had no choice but to kill the boy. Sideshow Bob was indeed spotted near the crime scene, associating with known rakes, of the boy, Bart Simpson, he vowed to kill. Bart, of course, is a master prankster and we wouldn't have had that much sympathy for him until he turned up again."

"Gone Boy" scored a 2.3 rating with an 8 share and was watched by 6.06 million people, making it Fox's highest rated show of the night.

Notes

References

External links
 

2017 American television episodes
American Christmas television episodes
The Simpsons (season 29) episodes
Television episodes about murder
Television episodes about revenge